The  is a limited express electric multiple unit (EMU) train type operated by Kintetsu Railway since 1 April 2009.

Based on the earlier 22000 series design, each set features AC power outlets for passenger use, and a smoking compartment at one end of each set.

Interior 
Passenger accommodation consists of 2+2 abreast seating throughout. The seats have a  seat pitch, a  increase over the seat pitch of the earlier 22000 series. Several amenities, such as AC power outlets and footrests, are provided. The "Sa 22700" cars are equipped with universal-access toilets and men's toilets, and the "Ku 22900" cars are equipped with men's, women's, and unisex toilets. The "Ku 22900" cars also feature smoking compartments.

Formations

4-car sets
The 4-car sets (AF01–AF02) are formed as follows.

 Car 1 is equipped with a smoking compartment.
 Cars 1 and 3 are equipped with toilets.
 Cars 2 and 4 are each equipped with one PT7126-A single-arm pantograph.
 Car 3 is equipped with two wheelchair spaces.

2-car sets
The 2-car sets (AT51 onward) are formed as follows.

 Car 1 is equipped with men's, women's, and unisex toilets (one of each) and a smoking compartment.
 Car 2 is equipped with two PT7126-A single-arm pantographs.

History 
Details of the 22600 series were first announced on 11 December 2008. Initially, 10 vehicles were introduced, at a cost of approximately 1.9 billion yen, formed as two 4-car sets and one 2-car set. A further 22 vehicles (eleven 2-car sets) were delivered from Kinki Sharyo between 2009 and 2010.

In 2010, the 22600 series received the Laurel Prize, presented annually by the Japan Railfan Club.

On 23 January 2014, Kintetsu and Hanshin Electric Railway both announced plans to operate through-service chartered trains, primarily on Saturdays and holidays, between Kobe-Sannomiya Station on the Hanshin Main Line and Kashikojima Station on the Kintetsu Shima Line, using 22600 series trainsets. These services commenced on 22 March 2014.

In 2015, Kintetsu announced plans to introduced a new livery for its general-purpose limited express fleet, replacing the previous orange and navy blue livery with a white, gold, and yellow livery. Two-car set AT56 was the first set to receive the updated colour scheme, first bearing the new livery in July 2016.

See also
 Kintetsu 16600 series, a narrow-gauge derivative of the 22600 series

References

Citations

Sources 

 Kintetsu News Release, 11 December 2008 Kintetsu website, retrieved 8 January 2009

External links

 Kintetsu 22600 series official information 

Electric multiple units of Japan
22600 series
Train-related introductions in 2009
1500 V DC multiple units of Japan
Kinki Sharyo multiple units